Hrusice is a municipality and village in Prague-East District in the Central Bohemian Region of the Czech Republic. It has about 900 inhabitants.

Hrusice is known as birthplace of Josef Lada and was popularized through his paintings and illustrations on Christmas and Easter postcards and children's books.

Geography

The municipality is situated in rolled landscape of the Benešov Uplands.

There are two ponds in the municipal territory, Hrusický in the centre of the village and Hubačovský in the northwest. The Hrusický Stream flows through the municipality, but has only local significance.

History
The first written mention of Hrusice is from 1205, in a deed of King Ottokar I of Bohemia. Hrusice belonged to the direct administration of the Přemyslid dynasty. In 1848 the municipality gained self-government.

Demographics
The municipality has experienced a significant growth in the 21st century thanks to good connection to the capital city.

Transport
The accessibility of Hrusice is very good due to proximity of two major transport lines. The D1 motorway from Prague to Brno passes through the municipal territory of Hrusice.

There also operates a suburban bus line between Strančice and Stříbrná Skalice (via Mnichovice and Ondřejov) with a stop in the centre of Hrusice.

Sights

Church of Saint Wenceslaus in the centre of Hrusice is an example of rural Romanesque architecture from the turn of the 12th century with a valuable sandstone portal, a work by monks from the Sázava Monastery.

Josef Lada Memorial in artist's villa, nowadays a branch of Prague-East Regional Museum, presents his life and work as well as his daughter Alena Ladová, also a renowned illustrator.

Notable people
Josef Lada (1887–1957), painter, illustrator and writer

Gallery

References

External links

 
Brief tourist info 

Villages in Prague-East District